Donisthorpe is a surname. Notable people with the surname include:

Horace Donisthorpe (1870–1951), British myrmecologist and coleopterist
Richard Donisthorpe, (fl. 1797) (usually Richard Donisthorp), English clockmaker
Wordsworth Donisthorpe (1847–1914), English individualist, anarchist and inventor
Martin Donisthorpe Armstrong, English writer
G. Sheila Donisthorpe (1898-1946), English novelist and playwright